Rodolfo Gonçalves Leite de Abrantes (born September 20, 1972) is a Brazilian hardcore punk singer and electric guitar player. He was the vocalist and former leader of the Brazilian bands Raimundos and Rodox and now he is a solo gospel artist, as well as pastor and minister. Formerly atheist, he converted to Protestant Christianity.

Discography

as part of Raimundos

as part of Rodox

Solo

Other work 
 Ando Jururu 1997, in partnership with Rita Lee on the album Santa Rita de Sampa
 Eu Sou Rebelde 1998, in partnership with Virgulóides on the album Só Pra Quem Tem Dinheiro?
 Bons Aliados 1999, in partnership with Charlie Brown Jr. on the album Preço Curto... Prazo Longo
 Homem do Povo 2001, in partnership with Natiruts on the album Verbalize
 Tira as Crianças da Sala 2002, in partnership with DJ Marcelinho  on the album Riscando Um
 Santo Sangue, e Frenesi 2006, in partnership with Pregador Luo of Apocalipse 16.
 Nova Aurora of the band Strike on CD Nova Aurora - 2012.

Videography
 (2013) Ele Continua o Mesmo

References

1972 births
Living people
21st-century Brazilian male singers
Brazilian male guitarists
Brazilian rock guitarists
Brazilian gospel singers
21st-century Brazilian singers

Converts to Protestantism from atheism or agnosticism
Converts to evangelical Christianity
Brazilian evangelicals